BLDGBLOG is an architecture blog authored by futurist Geoff Manaugh, former editor at Dwell magazine, former Editor-in-Chief at Gizmodo, and a contributing editor at Wired UK. It is acclaimed by The Wall Street Journal, The Atlantic and The Architectural Review. Manaugh's book A Burglar's Guide to the City has been published by Farrar, Straus and Giroux. It was named by Amazon as one of the best books of 2016.

Bibliography 
The BLDGBLOG Book was published by Chronicle Books in April 2009. The book includes numerous essays and images from the website, but Manaugh's favored themes are heavily expounded in the body text of the book, which was written specifically for the publication.

References

External links 
BLDGBLOG

Architecture websites